En (Н н; italics: Н н) is a letter of the Cyrillic script.

History
The Cyrillic letter En was derived from the Greek letter Nu (Ν ν).

Form
The capital Cyrillic letter En looks exactly the same as the capital Latin letter H but, as with most Cyrillic letters, the lowercase form is simply a smaller version of the uppercase. Rather than from the Greek letter Eta, from which Latin H originated, the Cyrillic letter En  was derived from the Greek letter Nu. By exception, the Romanian Cyrillic alphabet used N and ɴ, instead of Н and н. The confusion between the two characters forms part of the plot of the Agatha Christie novel Murder on the Orient Express.

Related letters and other similar characters
Ν ν : Greek letter Nu
N n : Latin letter N
Њ њ : Cyrillic letter Nje
Η η : Greek letter Eta
H h : Latin letter H
ʜ : Latin letter small capital H

Computing codes

External links